John McEnroe defeated the two-time defending champion Ivan Lendl in a rematch of the previous year's final, 6–3, 6–4, 6–4 to win the singles title at the 1983 Volvo Masters.

Draw

Finals

See also
ATP World Tour Finals appearances

References
1983 Masters-Singles

Singles